In the United States, pay-to-stay is the practice of charging prisoners for their accommodation in jails. The practice is controversial, because it can result in large debts being accumulated by prisoners who are then unable to repay the debt following their release, preventing them from successfully reestablishing themselves in society. In 2015, the American Civil Liberties Union of Ohio published a comprehensive study of the pay-to-stay policy throughout the state of Ohio, the first detailed study of its kind.

In 2017, The Marshall Project published a study of jails in Southern California, where wealthier prisoners could pay to be housed in a more comfortable, safer prison in a different jurisdiction, sometimes with more furlough privileges.
The facilities are located in Seal Beach, Anaheim, Arcadia, Burbank, Glendale, Huntington Beach, Pasadena, Santa Ana and Torrance. These prisons offer many benefits, including private cells, less violence and even the opportunity for convicts to serve their sentence only on weekends or after work.

In modern times pay-to-stay programs have been noted for their low debt collection rate that often range between 10 to 15 percent due to people being in pay-to-stay being much more likely to suffer from poverty; over a two fiscal year period, Eaton County, Michigan collected only around 5% of over $1 million charged in pay-to-stay fees.

History 
In an NPR interview Lisa Foster the leader of an anti-pay to stay advocacy group Fines and Fees Justice Center stated that Pay-to-stay programs in the United States became popular in the 1980's following large increases in Incarceration in the United States and law enforcement agencies attempting to increase revenues following federal spending cuts in local law enforcement programs.

As of 2021 prisons in about 40 states have a pay-to-stay programs with fees and implementation often varying by county.

See also 

 Debtor's prison

References 

Penology